Laisterdyke railway station is a closed station in the city of Bradford, West Yorkshire, England, that served the suburb of the same name.

History

The station was opened on 1 August 1854 on the Leeds, Bradford and Halifax Junction Railway's Leeds to  line. Three years later, a second route from the station to  via  and Morley (Top) was opened by the same company, making the station a junction of some importance. The facilities provided here were consequently quite generous, with four platforms, two signal boxes and a sizeable goods yard. The branch to Shipley was an early casualty of road competition, losing its passenger service in February 1931. The other routes survived to be taken into British Railways ownership upon nationalisation in 1948. Both, however, succumbed to the Beeching Axe in the mid-1960s, with services on the Pudsey Loop and to Wakefield via Batley services ending in 1964, and those via Ardsley to  following suit two years later.

The station was closed to passengers on 4 July 1966, on the same day as the line to Ardsley.  The platforms were subsequently demolished. Only the station house remains on the top of the cutting south of the tracks, and a siding serves a scrap yard west of the former passenger station.

Route

References

External links
Laisterdyke East Signal Box diagram
Laisterdyke West Signal Box diagram
Lost Railways of West Yorkshire - Pudsey Loop

Disused railway stations in Bradford
Former Great Northern Railway stations
Railway stations in Great Britain opened in 1854
Railway stations in Great Britain closed in 1966